Boys to Manzo is an American reality television web series that began airing from May 30 to July 10, 2011, on the official website for Bravo. A spin-off to The Real Housewives of New Jersey, the series features Albie and Chris Manzo, the sons of full-time cast member of The Real Housewives of New Jersey Caroline Manzo, living independently away from home with their housemate Gregg Bennett, in Hoboken, New Jersey.

Development
Bravo released the web series titled Boys To Manzo on May 30, 2011, while season three of The Real Housewives of New Jersey was airing.
The series stars Albie and Chris Manzo, the sons of full-time cast member of The Real Housewives of New Jersey, Caroline Manzo, along with friend Gregg Bennett
The six episode web series depicts the two brothers moving out and seeking independence on their own with their housemate and friend, Greg Bennett, and was primary filmed in their Hoboken apartment.
The series consists of 6 episodes.

Several years later, Caroline Manzo received her own spin-off titled Manzo'd with Children, in which her sons also star. The series premiered on October 5, 2014, and has aired a total of three seasons.

Episodes

References

Television shows set in New Jersey
Bravo (American TV network) original programming
The Real Housewives spin-offs
2011 web series debuts
2011 web series endings
English-language television shows